Rasulova is a surname. Notable people with the surname include:

Lidiya Khudat Rasulova (1941–2012), Azerbaijani politician
Luiza Rasulova (born 1995), Uzbek actress and presenter
Muharram Rasulova (1926–2006), Tajikistani botanist
Oksana Rasulova (born 1982), Azerbaijani dancer, choreographer and actress

Surnames of Uzbekistani origin
Azerbaijani-language surnames
Kazakh-language surnames
Kyrgyz-language surnames
Russian-language surnames
Tajik-language surnames
Turkmen-language surnames
Uzbek-language surnames